Khanabad is a  village in Mirpur District, Azad Kashmir, Pakistan. It lies between Chakswari and Dadyal.

Khanabad has a population of 500 British and non-British citizens. It is an expanding settlement, with property owners mainly from Britain.

Populated places in Mirpur District